Erdoğan is a Turkish name meaning "who is born as a brave man, soldier or warrior", "brave, warrior hawk", or "fighter". Erdogan has about the same connotations as the name Eugene used by many European cultures. Notable people with the name include:

Given name
 Erdoğan Arıca (1954–2012), Turkish football manager
 Erdoğan Atalay (born 1966), Turkish-German actor
 Erdoğan Aygan (born 1979), Turkish Paralympian archer
 Erdoğan Bayraktar (born 1948), Turkish politician
 Erdoğan Büyükkasap (1962–2010), Turkish scientist and academic
 Erdoğan Kaya (born 2001), Turkish footballer
 Erdoğan Teziç (1936–2017), Turkish academic in constitutional law
 Erdoğan Toprak (born 1961), Turkish businessman and politician
 Erdoğan Yeşilyurt (born 1993), Turkish-German footballer

Surname
 Ahmet Burak Erdoğan (born 1979), a son of Turkish President Recep Tayyip Erdoğan
 Aslı Erdoğan (born 1967), Turkish novelist
 Azize Erdoğan (born 1996), Turkish women's footballer
 Emrah Erdoğan,Turkish singer and actor
 Enver Erdogan, Australian politician
  (1925–2015), a professor emeritus of mechanical engineering and mechanics and dean emeritus of the college of engineering at Lehigh University
 İsyan Erdogan (born 1982), Australian footballer
 Kayacan Erdoğan (born 1988), Turkish footballer
 Mert Erdoğan (born 1989), Turkish footballer
 Murat Erdoğan (born 1976), Turkish footballer
 Nehir Erdoğan (born 1980), Turkish actress
 Ömer Erdoğan (born 1977), Turkish footballer
 Recep Tayyip Erdoğan (born 1954), President of Turkey
 Serkan Erdoğan (born 1978), Turkish basketballer
 Uğur Erdoğan (born 1987), Turkish footballer
 Yılmaz Erdoğan (born 1967), Turkish film director
 Özdemir Erdoğan (born 1940), Turkish singer-songwriter and author

See also
 Erdoğan, Kestel
 Ka-50-2 "Erdogan"

References

Turkish-language surnames
Turkish masculine given names